The Blood Syndicate is a fictional multicultural vigilante gang of superhumans created by Milestone Comics and published by DC Comics. The team first appeared in Blood Syndicate #1  (April 1993), and was created by Dwayne McDuffie, Ivan Velez Jr. and Denys Cowan.

Publication history
In Milestone Comics' fictional city of Dakota, the Blood Syndicate is a loose affiliation of super-powered individuals brought together by circumstance; 35 issues of their eponymous comic book, written largely by Ivan Velez, Jr., were published between 1993 and 1996.

The Blood Syndicate differed from other supergroups in that they were (in Velez's words) "not a team - they're a gang". In fact, they were the surviving remnants of multiple street gangs (thus the name, a combination of "Paris Island Bloods" and "Force Syndicate"), who had gained superpowers in the so-called Big Bang, and decided to use them for a greater purpose. However, their constant in-fighting, the unsustainability of their methods, and their lack of a central vision (particularly after the death of their first leader) led to the Syndicate's eventual disintegration.

Fictional team history
The "Big Bang" refers to an incident in which gang members from all over Dakota met in one, huge battle. The police got word of the coming attack and planned to gas the lot of them with tear gas laced with a radioactive marker and take them all into custody. Their plan was to track down any gang member who got away using the radioactive marker. Unknown to them, or even to the police involved, the tear gas used to disperse them was laced with a mutative agent called "quantum juice". Many gang members and police officers died, while others transformed according to their state of mind or what they were close to when the gas hit them. One woman (a member of the Sociedad De La Cruz gang) landed in water; her body became water and she developed the ability to control other water as well. She named herself Aquamaria. Another woman stumbled into a brick wall, merged with it and became solid brick. Other entities were affected in other ways. A police officer gained the power to emit golden energy blasts and joined the Shadow Cabinet as Oro. Dogg, a normal dog who was the pet of the Force Syndicate, developed human level cognitive abilities and the ability to speak.

Coming together
The surviving gang members eventually came together and formed a new gang. Tech Nine, Flashback, Fade and Dogg from the Force Syndicate reached out to whoever else they could find. They reached out to Holocaust first, but he killed them all with his fire powers. Flashback saved them with her power to turn time back three seconds. They convinced him not to attack them again, and he helps them recruit Wise Son (by threatening his family). They found Third Rail in a homeless camp deep below the streets, suffering from guilt over his father. They tricked Juan Templo into leaving the safety of a local church to join them. The group agreed to work together, and after a healthy disagreement, chose the name Blood Syndicate (a combination of the names of the two rival gangs they came from, "Force Syndicate" and "Paris Bloods").

Their first action as a gang was when they attacked a crack house to steal the money for "operating expenses". Their raid killed many addicts and criminals, and gained them another member, Masquerade. He was hired to guard the drugs, but the new gang recruited him to join them instead. They went back to "Ground Zero", the place where the Bang happened, only to be ambushed by a large contingent of local criminals. Templo was killed, but the new gang worked together and killed every last one of their attackers.

Media spotlight
Brickhouse and DMZ joined the team at some point after their first crackhouse raid and the annihilation of the attack force. Their exploits attracted the attention of Dakota's local media. The Dakota Chronicle, the city's most popular newspaper sent reporter, Roberta "Rob" Chaplik, to score an interview with the Syndicate. Chaplik followed them to a raid on a crack-house, their main source of money. She was killed by one of the drug dealers, but Flashback reversed her death by turning back time three seconds and pushing Rob out of the way of the shotgun blast that killed her the first time. Holocaust burned the shooter to death before he could fire again.

Holocaust challenged Tech Nine for leadership of the gang, and by the rules they'd set down, they had trial by combat to choose which of them would be the leader. Tech Nine took a horrible beating, but thanks to Holocaust's arrogance and his own power of unlimited gunfire/telekinetic control over his guns, he won the fight. Holocaust left the gang in anger rather than submit to Tech's leadership and went off to form a criminal empire.

They took in a new member, a rat-man called the Boogieman, and sought purpose. The gang didn't have a true focus, but as their leader, Tech Nine tried to give them one. They discovered and destroyed a hidden lab under the local hospital where scientists experimented on Bang Babies. Boogieman was a big help in fighting the armored security guards protecting the place, and Brickhouse remembered being experimented on in that very lab. They blew the place sky high, but the lab's creator got away to set up shop elsewhere.

The gang went back to their home (an abandoned factory on the land where the Big Bang took place) to celebrate with food and beer. During the party, the quantum juice destabilized Tech's body and he died painfully - his flesh melted off of his body. Wise Son took over as leader, but it was clear he was less popular than Tech.

As Wise Son sought to fill Tech's shoes, the team faced multiple threats and disasters. They pondered what to do for money when they ran out of crack houses to rob, but before they could plan, a Chinese mobster named John Wing sent his forces to kill the Syndicate so they wouldn't interfere with his plans. When they captured him. Wise Son chose to humiliate the man by urinating on him. Wing felt that he had to get revenge at all costs, and murdered his own wife in a supernatural ritual and summoned the Demon Fox. The Fox warned him of the cost of its services, and Wing agreed. After decimating the Syndicate, the Fox returned to Wing to take payment - Wing's life.

The Fox attacked the Syndicate in their headquarters and nearly killed the entire team. In the process, the Fox revealed their deepest secrets; the various revelations hurt worse than the significant physical damage from the fight. The Fox would have killed them all if not for the appearance of Kwai, who was reborn in response to the Fox's rebirth. Kwai revealed that they were mirror sisters - one cannot exist without the other as a counterbalance.

As the gang members woke up slowly, some of them learned each other's secrets. Flashback woke up near Boogieman, and saw that, his speech pattern and mannerisms notwithstanding, Boogieman was white. Fade and Masquerade woke up near each other. During the fight, the Fox reached into Fade's mind and revealed that Fade is gay, something he did not want his teammates to ever know. Masquerade overheard, right before taking a severe beating from the Fox. Fade woke up before Masquerade, and saw that Masquerade had reverted to a female form when knocked cold. Fade promised not to tell anyone that Masquerade was born  a woman, and Masquerade threatened that if he did, he'd tell everybody that Fade was gay (he used an anti-gay slur to drive his point home).

Soon after they survived the Demon Fox, a super being named Rift with reality warping powers nearly destroyed their reality and the one inhabited by the DC superheroes. The Syndicate had to fight alongside the heroes they knew (Static, Icon, Rocket, Hardware) and with Superman, Superboy and Steel from the DC universe. Eventually they all manipulated Rift into reversing the damage he caused and to go into hibernation, where he couldn't alter reality any further.

Wise Son's son Edmund and his little sister Cornelia developed teleportation powers, presumably from following Wise to the Bang. They wrote their destination on mirrors and could then travel through said mirrors to get there.

The team's tensions escalated. Wise Son embarrassed Boogieman by forcing him to reveal that he was a white male under all his fur. He acted like he put Boogie off the team for lying to them, but then told him he could stay and don't lie to them ever again. This furthered dislike of Wise's leadership, particularly by Third Rail. He and Brickhouse developed a romantic relationship and contemplated moving out on their own when Masquerade betrayed the team. They chose to raid one last crackhouse to raise money (they'd spent most of their reserves on renovations to their headquarters). Kwai was shot during this raid and nearly died. Wise Son blamed Flashback - he'd told her to watch out for Kwai since she was new, but Flashback was more interested in stealing some of the crack to fuel her habit.

They got Kwai back to their headquarters at her request; she was able to heal herself supernaturally. As the rest of them made their way home, Masquerade stole the money and successfully made a break for it. This widened the growing rift in the team and prompted Third and Brick to take their remaining money and leave the gang to start a life together.

Tensions
Masquerade and some other Bang Babies dealt with another branch of S.Y.S.T.E.M. They were captured for a brief time, but escaped, transformed and with their powers enhanced. Masquerade knew he could never return to the Syndicate and sought to make a team of those who were captured, but they all went their separate ways.

Third Rail and Brickhouse left the gang, but still found trouble. They opened a burger joint together, but Third was attacked by a gigantic foe, the Techno Shaman. He possessed Third, but Brickhouse called on her old friends for help and they defeated the Shaman. When he lay defeated, Brickhouse sent the others away and finished him off.

Kwai recovered from her injuries but learned that she was on the last of a series of mystically granted lives. She traveled to her home realm, Kwen Lun, the Wondrous Lands, in a desperate attempt to gain at least one more buffer life. During Kwai's troubles, Tech Nine seemingly returned from the dead. His grave was empty, and they had to believe it was him. They looked for Dogg to confirm things, but Dogg was gone. He had been captured by operatives of a murderous organization called S.Y.S.T.E.M., who wanted to experiment on him and other Bang Babies.

Tech spoke boldly to Fade about having feelings for him, something the real Tech never had. Fade was attracted to Tech, but Tech never took it seriously, nor did he slam Fade for his sexual orientation. As the gang searched for Dogg, suspicions mounted about Tech.

Upon returning home, Kwai met with her old friend, the Monkey King, and the two pleaded to her father, the Jade Emperor for another life. The Emperor denied this request, declaring that she had grown too attached to the mortal world. He then sentenced her to death without reincarnation stating that she broke the blood contract between them by rebelling against him.

To save Kwai's life, the Monkey King recruited most of the Syndicate to go with him to Kwen Lun to save her, while Tech-9 and Flashback stayed behind as backup. In the Kingdom of Ti Yu (Hell), Kwai was offered marriage to the Dog God to save her existence, but decides she couldn't marry him and went to meet the Grey Lady. There she learned that her entire existence as Kwai was nothing more than entertainment for the gods of the Wondrous Lands in the form of a never-ending battle against the Demon Fox. The Grey Lady offered Kwai another chance to live and marry the Dog God, but Kwai refused, deciding that she would no longer allow those gods to control her existence - even if it meant her death. The Grey Lady, impressed with her spirit allowed her to return, with the warning that her father would not stop until he had his revenge.

The Beginning of the end
After returning to Earth, the gang barged into Utopia Park uninvited. Their presence caused a riot. Wise Son was responsible for stopping it, as chronicled in the Milestone crossover event Long Hot Summer. Tech-9 persuaded him to use the Utopia Park PA system to appeal for an end to the violence. Wise did so eloquently, and the rioters backed down.

After this, they had a final battle with the Demon Fox. They found out that she dug up Tech-Nine's body and gave his essence to Masquerade. This enabled him to impersonate Tech so well that he actually believed he was him, and to wield his powers. The Demon Fox and Masquerade, who was in thrall to the Fox, fought the Syndicate tooth and nail. During the fighting, the Fox revealed that Brickhouse was pregnant with Third's baby, and apparently caused her to miscarry. Kwai rose up and destroyed the Fox, at the cost of her own life. Kwai didn't perish - she reverted to 9 year-old Nina Lam, but seemingly with Kwai's memories.

The Syndicate now knew that Masquerade was born female, and confronted him for his deception. He proclaimed that under his leadership they became more efficient than ever before, and that with him, they could achieve their true potential as a team. He convinced none of them and left the team in disgrace. Wise Son disagreed with his methods, but admitted that he was right and that they "never lived up to the hype". He states that they all kept too many secrets from each other and that they fought each other more than their enemies. The team decided they were tired of the pain that they had endured and the constant violence around them and disbanded. A few days later, while recounting the events of the past ordeal to Rob Chaplik, Dogg appeared before Wise Son and told him that "the Syndicate isn't over; it's just stopped for a while is all". Wise Son smiled and replied "thicker than blood, G. Thicker than blood".

Milestone Forever
Since their disbanding, the Blood Syndicate left a hole in the hearts of its members, powerful people left to fend for themselves. Holocaust made his inevitable return and reinstated the Blood Syndicate as they once were; a gang. He tried to take his actions out into the streets and claim Dakota City as his own, but the others rose up against him. Wise Son challenged Holocaust to a battle for the rightful leadership of the Syndicate. Wise Son won, and it seemed that Holocaust burned himself to death, yet again. It remains to be seen if Holocaust actually died, but Wise Son became their undisputed leader. Wise had ideas to bring his family to the light, away from Holocaust's fire.

DC Universe
Following the death of Darkseid (as chronicled in Final Crisis), the space-time continuum was torn asunder, threatening the existence of both the Dakotaverse and the mainstream DC universe. The being known as Dharma was able to use energies that he harnessed from Rift (upon that being's defeat in Worlds Collide) to merge the two universes, creating an entirely new continuity. Only Dharma, Icon and Superman are aware that Dakota and its inhabitants ever existed in a parallel universe.

In the revised continuity, Holocaust has been defeated in battle by Static (now a member of the Teen Titans) and the similarly powered Black Lightning (of the Justice League of America).

Solicits have revealed that in February 2010, Holocaust will show up as an adversary of the Teen Titans in issue #80 of their series. On the covers for issues #80 and #81, he is shown battling Aquagirl and Superboy respectively.

Membership
 Aquamaria - Maria (last name unknown) survived the Big Bang while floating in the (fictional) James River; as a result, she gained the ability to manipulate and transform into water. She also has substantial control over water in all its forms, being able to create tsunamis and geysers, and shape near-freezing vapor into ice sculptures.
 Boogieman, or Boogie - Martin Berger is able to transform into a giant humanoid rat. He is also able to communicate with the hyper-intelligent rats of Dakota, even when untransformed. A post-Texador member, Berger joined the Syndicate during their attack on the S.Y.S.T.E.M. conspiracy. When his mother was trapped in a hospital full of angry inter-dimensional chihuahuas, he chose to rescue her with only Static as backup.
 Brickhouse (or Brick): Marta (last name unknown) survived the Big Bang while pressed up against a brick wall; as a result, she took on its characteristics, becoming a 10-foot-tall, super-strong woman of living brick. However, this led to a substantial amount of brain damage, and she was subject both to epilepsy and retrograde amnesia (by the time the series was canceled, she still did not know her last name). Her name was inspired by the Commodores song "Brick House".
 DMZ - DMZ's name is an abbreviated form of the term, demilitarized zone. Little is known about him. He has superhuman strength and durability and is able to fly; furthermore, his eyes glow red.  DMZ never speaks (except during the Worlds Collide crossover, when he said the word "Damn"); nor does he ever take off his mask, even to eat. He spends his free time atop a bridge, whirling a lamp on a chain in the hopes of signaling passing extraterrestrials, and wears what appears to be the uniform of the D'amsi police officers of Icon's interplanetary civilization, the Cooperative. When Icon asked DMZ to join him (when an alien rescue party arrives for Icon) he declines. Dwayne McDuffie stated on his Delphi forum that DMZ is a human who teamed up with a member of the D'amsi police force when she chased a criminal to Earth. He was severely wounded saving her life, so she used her technology to optimize him, unlocking his full human potential. She left the Earth to chase the villain as he healed, promising to return for him. He got his name from a mis-heard 'D'amsi'.
 Dogg: Originally Texador's/Tech-9's pet dog, Dogg gains human-level intelligence and speech, while remaining a dog in shape, personality, and abilities.  First introduced in issue #2, he became a valued member of the team despite his size and shape. When Pyre formed his own Blood Syndicate, Dogg was one of those who rejected the offer to join.
 Fade: Carlos Quinones Jr. is the brother of Sara Quinones (Flashback).  He can fly and pass through solid objects (quantum tunnelling), and frequently has difficulty becoming substantial. He is actually "spread out" over a three-second interval, and is thereby able to, for instance, punch someone and leave them unharmed until after he has left, as was stated in the comic: "Fade isn't what he does, it's what he endures". He is a deeply closeted gay man, and was in love with Texador (Tech-9). He also has the undeveloped ability to travel back (and possibly forward) in time by significant amounts, evidenced by Kwai recognising him the first time she meets the Syndicate, as someone she had known in one of her previous incarnations. A side effect of this ability are the instances of clairvoyance he sometimes displays.
 Flashback: Sara Quinones, sister of Carlos Quinones (Fade). Flashback can fly and can travel back in time three seconds, an ability she uses to change the past. She considers herself responsible for the welfare of the Syndicate as a whole because she has witnessed (and reversed) their deaths and severe injuries on multiple occasions. She is also a crack addict, partly because of the stress of having seen her friends die so many times, which only she remembers.  Later, Rocket, sidekick to Icon, would intervene in her drug habit.
 Holocaust (later Pyre): Leonard Smalls, Jr. is the illegitimate son of Dakota mayor Thomasina Jefferson. A superhumanly strong pyrokinetic, Smalls left the Syndicate after a leadership struggle with Texador/Tech-9, and chose to abandon the small-scale world of gangs for the greater possibilities offered by organized crime. As an initiation ritual, he was obliged to surrender something of great value to him: his name, and the reputation that came with it. Unable to call himself Holocaust, Smalls renamed himself Pyre. As Pyre, he tried to reform a new Blood Syndicate of his own recruiting: Boogieman, Flashback, Mistress Death, Bad Betty, Fade, Tarmack, Bubbasaurus, and Rocket (who was undercover). Smalls then reclaimed his name - Holocaust.

 Kwai (Shen Hsien Pu Kwei) - one of the two non-Bang Babies in the Blood Syndicate (DMZ being the other), Nina Lam was the 77th - and last - incarnation of a Chinese mystical being. Originally a 9-year-old girl, Lam was mystically transformed into a 7-foot-tall adult woman with albino-pale skin, immensely long hair, and pointed ears.  She encountered the Syndicate in the wake of their defeat by the Demon Fox, and thanks to Flashback, survived a booby trap set by John Wing's Demon Fox Tong. After the Blood Syndicate was saved and restored by Nina Lam, now Kwai, she joins the Blood Syndicate and periodically calmed Brickhouse's seizures. Kwai fought alongside the Blood Syndicate a number of times and was once shot during a crackhouse raid; while she went into a healing cocoon, Hannibal White (Wise Son) tortured Kwai's shooter. Later Kwai's healing light changed the Blood Syndicate back to normal for a short time, and learns that she's down to her last life.  After Brickhouse and Third Rail leave, Kwai decided to leave, later seen returning to her homeland, the Kingdom of Kwen Lun; meeting with her old friend, the Monkey King, revealing that she needs to ask her father, the Jade Emperor for another life, as she is sentenced to death without reincarnation.  Ending up in the Kingdom of Ti Yu (hell), Kwai was offered marriage to the Dog God there to save her existence, but decides she can't marry him; finally in a battle royale with the Blood Syndicate against the Demon Fox, Kwai and the Demon Fox apparently destroyed each other, leaving the 9-year-old Nina Lam surviving. Later in the Static Shock: Return of The Cool mini-series, Nina is shown meeting with the Syndicate, and apparently attempting to transform back into Kwai by saying her name, reminiscent of the 'SHAZAM' transformation of DC's Captain Marvel. Although she is rendered unconscious before she can say the word, she is later seen in the form of Kwai, implying that she has been granted a 'normal life' as Nina, with the potential to become Kwai in times of danger.
 Masquerade: A shapechanger able to assume the form of any animal (including humans), Masquerade is a transgender man. He kept his assigned gender (female) to himself, using his abilities to present himself as the man he truly was. He fled the Syndicate after reflexively stealing several thousand dollars from them. A brief encounter later failed to convince him the Syndicate had changed their ways, and he would not be killed for his betrayal. He returned in the guise of a resurrected Rolando Texador (Tech-9), hoping to be accepted as their leader. As leader, Masquerade was responsible for the Syndicate instigating the Utopia Park riot.
 Oro: Miguel Medina is a former police officer who survived the Big Bang as a member of the Riot Squad.  After the Big-Bang, he was for a time a member of the Shadow Cabinet but was kicked out, and later framed for the murder of his ex-partner. He subsequently sought refuge with the Syndicate and helped protect their territory. He can fly, project energy blasts and produce blinding visual displays. Being an ex-policeman, he took some time to win the respect of the rest of the Syndicate, having to endure the nickname 'Oral' for some time.

 Tech-9 (or Tech): Rolando Texador, formerly leader of the Force Syndicate, had the ability of "talismanic telekinesis", making him able to shoot endless quantities of bullets from any and all guns, with perfect accuracy. He could also materialize guns in his hands; his favored was the Tech-9 semi-automatic handgun, which he takes his name from.  Charismatic and with military training, he masterminded the Syndicate's formation and led them in their raids on crackhouses, but his flesh spontaneously melted off his bones when his superpower destabilized. Later in the series, Masquerade impersonates Tech-9, having sided with the Demon Fox.
 Third Rail: The son of Korean immigrants, Pui Chung is able to absorb any form of energy and use it to grow in size and strength.
 Wise Son (or Wise): Hannibal White, leader of the Syndicate after Texador's death and a Black Muslim ("Wise Son" is a Qur'anic reference), is invulnerable and has superstrength. Although he is able to, for instance, shave his head (as he did in 1997's Wise Son: the White Wolf miniseries by Ho Che Anderson), he is completely immune from physical harm.  Wise Son was responsible for stopping the Utopia Park riot, chronicled in the Milestone crossover event 'Long Hot Summer', after Masquerade, disguised as Tech-9, persuaded him to use the Utopia Park PA system to appeal for an end to the violence. He has also shown the ability to resist mental manipulation, and to survive the draining of large quantities of his lifeforce.  He is the father of Edmund White, and has sole custody.

Other characters
Babe - Bodyguard of the House of L'Amour beauty salon, and possibly lover to its transvestite beautician.  As a Bang Baby, he resembles a humanoid blue ox. He is seen in issue #27 "Possessions" - returning to the House of L'Amour after being held by S.Y.S.T.E.M. (originally, he was distraught after returning from S.Y.S.T.E.M. with an enhanced—more muscular—appearance).
Bubbasaur/Bubbasaurus - Bubba Brown, able to turn into a huge dinosaur-like creature resembling a carnotaurus; introduced in issue #11 as a spurned student going after a high school principal—Carlos Quinones Sr. (Fade's father), though Bubba Brown was seemingly killed in a fight with Fade (Carlos Quinones Jr.), he was picked up by Mom's S.Y.S.T.E.M. troops and taken to Garden Station.  He joins in an escape attempt by the other prisoners.
Demon Fox - A Chinese mystical vampire who first appears in issue #6. It is awakened by John Wing, leader of the Demon Fox Tong, when he killed his wife in order to unleash the Demon Fox (this is in response to being humiliated by the Blood Syndicate after failing to kill them). The Demon Fox finally strikes in issues #7 & #8 as it tears apart the Blood Syndicate, and brings up the darkest secrets of each Syndicate member.  After defeating the group, the Demon Fox kills Wing after granting his wish. Afterward, it is defeated by a newly transformed Kwai (previously Nina Lam) who comes to the rescue of the Blood Syndicate.  The Demon Fox aided Masquerade in imitating Tech-9 - by giving Masquerade some of Tech-9's essence so she can assume leadership of the Blood Syndicate; in issue #35, "The Beginning of the End" - in an all-out battle royale between the Demon Fox and Masquerade vs the Blood Syndicate - Kwai and the Demon Fox destroy each other.
Edmund and Cornelia - Wise Son's (illegitimate) son and little sister, respectively. They frequently visit him at the factory the Blood Syndicate call home, regardless of the constant danger they place themselves in. The two children have a teleportational ability; they can write a location or person on a mirror and enter, encountering what they desire.
Mom - The head of the Amber Cell of the S.Y.S.T.E.M./Coalition & heading the research into creating custom-made Bang-Babies and controlling them. Mom runs the Garden Station, the command center for the Amber sector of S.Y.S.T.E.M.
Templo - Juan Templo; a telekinetic and one of the founding Blood Syndicate members, was first seen in issue #9 "Fade to Back" in December 1993—the origin of the Blood Syndicate following the Big Bang is seen; the Blood Syndicate believed Templo was killed—but in issue #19, "Collections", Templo is seen alive in a hospital. In issue #21, "Retrievals", Templo is seen at the Garden Station where he is revived by Mom's scientists; in issue #24, "Things Fall Apart" Templo, along with others (Karess, Babe, Masquerade, Oro, and the Cross Station survivor) survived the Garden Station war. In issue #26, "Prodigals", Templo along with Mistress Mercy and Rose go to the church of Father Francisco.
White Roaches and the Rats - Two groups of vermin who acquired human characteristics during the Big Bang, they are now large, intelligent, and (especially in the case of the White Roaches) hostile.

In other media 

 Aquamaria appears in Static Shock, voiced by Erika Velez in the episode "Bad Stretch" and Yeni Álvarez in the episode "Wet and Wild". This version is a recurring enemy of Static who eventually voluntarily undergoes experimentation to remove her powers so she can reunite with her family.
 Brickhouse appears in the Static Shock episode "Army of Darkness", voiced by Dawnn Lewis. This version is part of the Night Breed, a group of Bang Babies who are highly sensitive to light and live underground.
 Fade appears in the Static Shock episode "Army of Darkness", voiced by Freddy Rodriguez. This version is a teenage member of the Night Breed, with only the power of intangibility and quantum tunnelling.
 A character similar to Flashback, Nina Crocker/Timezone, appears in the Static Shock episode "Flashback", voiced by Rachael MacFarlane. This version is a teenager with time travel powers who temporarily joins Static and Gear's team, but ultimately decides that her powers are too dangerous to have and goes back to time to stop herself from ever getting them.
 Holocaust appears in Young Justice, voiced by Zeno Robinson. This version is a member of Queen Bee's Onslaught.
 Tech appears in the Static Shock episode "Army of Darkness", voiced by Freddy Rodriguez. This version is a member of the Night Breed and possesses super intelligence.

References

External links
International Heroes: Blood Syndicate
Milestone Rave: Blood Syndicate Index
Blood Syndicate at the DC Database Project
Essay by Ivan Velez on the creation of Blood Syndicate

Fictional gangs
Milestone Comics characters
Milestone Comics titles
Fictional African-American people
Characters created by Dwayne McDuffie